

Overview
Streptococcus ferus is a facultatively anaerobic, gram-positive species of the genus Streptococcus. The species is a member of the Viridans streptococci group  which are a large mixed-group of mostly alpha-hemolytic streptococci. The alpha-hemolytic bacteria are ones that exhibit a partial hemolysis with green coloration when grown on sheep blood agar (see image.)

Ecology
Streptococcus ferus was originally isolated from the oral cavity wild rats who were living in sugar cane fields and eating a high sucrose diet  The species name ferus, meaning wild, refers to their association with these animals. More recently the strain has also been isolated from the nasal and oral cavities of pigs. The species has not been identified in any other host organisms.

Morphology
Streptococcus ferus are gram positive lanceolate coccobacillus Non-motile and approximately 0.5 micrometers in diameter. They are non-sporulating and catalase-negative The majority of specimens test positive for the production of acetoin (Vogues-Proskauer reaction).  They occur singly, in pairs or in short chains.

Pathogenicity
Streptococcus ferus is commensal in wild rats and pigs and demonstrates a relatively weak cariogenic potential compared to other streptococcus species such as S. mutans S. ferus has not had any reported pathogenic instances in humans.

History
Streptococcus ferus was originally proposed as a species in 1977

References

External links
Type strain of Streptococcus ferus at BacDive -  the Bacterial Diversity Metadatabase

Streptococcaceae